Gothicmed is a European Union project carried out within the Culture 2000 programme and headed by the Ministry of Culture of the regional government of Valencia (Valencian Community), Spain. The aim of the project is to gain further insight into Gothic architecture in the Mediterranean, to connect researchers working separately in different countries, and to disseminate the values of this chapter in architectural history.

The main objectives are the creation of a Transnational Cooperation Network of Mediterranean Gothic architecture through travelling exhibitions, the creation of scale models and a website. In particular, the purpose of the site is to facilitate a virtual access to some monuments that are not easy to visit physically or in a very poor state of preservation. In fact, some do not exist anymore but have been rebuilt with computer-aided architectural design of remaining elements.

The following institutions have also taken part in this project: Directorate of Byzantine and Postbyzantine Monuments (Greece Ministry of Culture), Arsenale di Palermo, Sicily (Italy), Hipocausto-Gabinete de Prestaçao de Serviços (Portugal), International Tourism Institute (Slovenia) and Instituto Cervantes (Spain). Numerous institutions (museums, universities, institutes) as well as individual researchers have also participated in this project.

Mediterranean Gothic

The Castel Maniace castle-residence in Sicily, the Bellver on Majorca, and the Castel Nuovo in Naples; in the cathedrals in Nicosia, Palma de Majorca, Girona or Albi; in the churches in Slovenia, Évora or Palermo; in the fourteenth-century palaces in Rhodes, Dubrovnik, Malta or Valencia, certain common stylistic features emerge that link them to this period in the history of architecture that we have come to call the Gothic. In reality, parallel to the re-emergence of classical forms, a coherent Gothic period emerged in the Mediterranean from the early 13th century until well into the 16th century.

Picking up the thread of a chapter of architecture whose monuments are scattered around a vast geographical area, and whose historiography is shared among different countries, is invariably a team effort. Currently, different teams of researchers are working independently in different groups. This project's goal is to create a network of research and dissemination on Mediterranean Gothic architecture that will enable this knowledge to be shared and spread.
In the Mediterranean, stylistic features readily intertwine with its contemporary mediaeval architecture in central and northern Europe. However, the buildings are often quite distinct. Not surprisingly, the mediaeval architectural styles in the Mediterranean were built following traditions from the late Roman era. The ruined buildings from the ancient world scattered around the Mediterranean were the building manuals for whoever wanted to read them. The presence of an interesting Manual on Practical Geometry, or Geometria fabrorum, conveyed by guilds and workshops, characterise this episode in architectural history.

The oft-repeated quote by Roman architect and treatise writer, Vitruvius, gains meaning once again. Architectura nascitur ex fabrica et ratiocinatione, that is, architecture is born (and thus must be studied) from action and reason. It is obvious that construction technique alone does not define a culture, yet it is also true that its very presence is the product of an initial, decisive choice. Applying reason to it shows the evolution of ideas about and the history of architecture. For this reason, the architectural technology in this chapter in the history of architecture is particularly insightful for us.

Virtual views

Study of the Gothic art and architectural landscape in the Mediterranean with travelling exhibition and conference. The action of Gothic monuments panoramic views are one of the most challenging actions of the project, since it has shown to put in practice a real exchange of experience between photographers of the different participating countries.

Each of the project partners has produced panoramic pictures that are being installed in the virtual gallery of the site. A tour through a borderless, virtual museum can be made through the open halls, which correspond to each of the sponsors of the project: Valencia Region, Greece, Sicily, Alentejo, Slovenia and the initiatives promoted by the Instituto Cervantes. Images of the monuments can be accessed via each of these halls by a virtual tour (panoramic images) or a guided tour (a text written by specialists, accompanied by layouts).
Other sections include a library, news and links with other related websites.
Upload onto Internet novel images inserted into virtual views of the most prominent monuments in this architectural style. These virtual views have been created through panoramic photographs, pictures galleries and videos. Texts have also been written with other images and drawings by specialists in the field, and the scientific community will have access to specialised books and articles online. GOTHICmed obviously cannot replace seeing and enjoying Mediterranean Gothic architecture firsthand, but it does encourage it to be visited and allows knowledge about it to be enhanced.
Moreover, all the partners have been invited to produce wooden scale models of the Gothic monuments or parts of monuments, like Gothic staircases, in order to be shown in the travelling exhibition which has been the more time-consuming activity of the project, since it has been necessary to join efforts of an interdisciplinary team of professionals.
All these models are at a scale of 1/50 and have been displayed on wooden pedestals. A total of 10 models travelled to each of the project's locations in the framework of the travelling exhibition in Valencia (ES), Évora (PT), Palermo (IT), Ljubljana (SI) and Athens (GR).

See also
 Gothic architecture
 Valencian Gothic

References

External links
 GOTHICmed: A Virtual Museum of Mediterranean Gothic Architecture

Gothic architecture
Virtual museums